Panusunan Pasaribu (22 June 1946 - 30 December 2020) was an Indonesian civil servant and politician who served as Regent of Central Tapanuli from 1995 to 2001.

Pasaribu completed his undergraduate education at Sanata Dharma University, Yogyakarta in 1972. After that he worked as a civil servant of the North Sumatra Provincial Government since 1974 until 1992. He then became Regional Secretary of Simalungun

He served until 2001 and after that was replaced by Tuani Lumbantobing. After becoming regent, Pasaribu continued his bureaucratic career in various positions in the Provincial Government again until his retirement in 2006.

Personal life and family
Pasaribu was married to Isna Hirawati and has two sons and one daughter. One of his sons, Dolly Pasaribu elected as Regent of South Tapanuli for the period 2021-2026.

His older brother  was Minister of Manpower in 1999-2000. His younger brother was also involved in politics, namely  who was the Regent of South Tapanuli (2010-2021), and  who was a member of the Indonesian Parliament since 2014.

Death
Pasaribu died on December 30, 2020, at the age of 74. He was buried the next day on 31 December in the village of Tanjung Dolok, Marancar, South Tapanuli.

References 

Indonesian civil servants
Indonesian politicians
1946 births 
2020 deaths